Peter Korčok (born 12 August 1974 in Šahy) is a former Slovak race walker. He is the current President of the Slovak Athletic Federation.

Achievements

External links

1974 births
Living people
Slovak male racewalkers
Athletes (track and field) at the 2000 Summer Olympics
Athletes (track and field) at the 2004 Summer Olympics
Athletes (track and field) at the 2008 Summer Olympics
Olympic athletes of Slovakia
People from Šahy
Sportspeople from the Nitra Region